Marcella Alsan is an infectious disease physician and an applied microeconomist studying health inequality. She is currently a Professor of Public Policy at the Harvard Kennedy School and was previously an Associate Professor of Medicine at Stanford University. She uses randomized evaluations and historical public health natural experiments to study how infectious disease, human capital, and economic outcomes interact. She has studied the effects of the Tuskegee Syphills Experiment on health care utilization and mortality among Black men. Alsan was awarded a MacArthur Fellowship in 2021.

Education 
Alsan received a BA in psychology from Harvard University magna cum laude, a master's in international public health from the Harvard School of Public Health, an MD from Loyola University magna cum laude, and a Ph.D. in economics from Harvard University. Alsan also trained with the Global Health Equity Residency in Internal Medicine at the Brigham and Women's Hospital and the Fellowship in Infectious Diseases at Partners with BWH and Massachusetts General Hospital.

Career 
Alsan's article, "Tuskegee and the Health of Black Men", with Marianne Wanamaker, found that life expectancy for black men at age 45 fell by 1.5 years following the disclosure of the Tuskegee study in 1972. It accounts for approximately 35% of the variance in the 1980 gap in the life expectancies between black and white men. Her work on the effects of physician workforce diversity in Oakland found that African-American subjects are much more likely to select every preventative health service when meeting a racially concordant doctor. Alsan's research on the effects of the tsetse fly on African development showed that ethnic groups living in areas with the TseTse are still affected economically due to its effects on precolonial political centralization. She also has significant publications in the areas of antimicrobial resistance and out of pocket health expenditures, infant mortality, and population health and foreign direct investment.

Alsan is the co-director of the Health Care Delivery Initiative of J-PAL North America. In her role, she has studied through evaluations the impact of messaging and incentives to increase survey response rates to identify barriers to COVID-19 testing in the US, with Banerjee and Duflo. She has also studied the effects of diversity in COVID-19 communications on health outcomes, and the effects on messages on COVID-19 prevention on preventative behaviours in India. Alsan has conducted additional research on COVID-19 behaviours and knowledge related disparities.

Alsan is on the Social Science advisory board for Science, is an editor for the Journal of Health Economics, and is a research associate at the National Bureau of Economic Research. Alsan was awarded a MacArthur Fellowship in 2021.

References 

Year of birth missing (living people)
Living people
Stanford University faculty
Harvard Kennedy School faculty
Harvard College alumni
Harvard School of Public Health alumni
Loyola University Chicago alumni
American economists